A list of mountain ranges of Yuma County, Arizona. Yuma, ArizonaWinterhaven, California is on the Colorado River in the southern section of the Lower Colorado River Valley.

Adjacent notable towns at this confluence of CaliforniaArizona, and Baja CaliforniaSonora, are Los Algodones, Baja California, and San Luis Rio Colorado, Sonora.

Alphabetical list
 Agua Caliente MountainsYuma County
 Aguila MountainsYuma County
 Bryan MountainsYuma County
 Butler MountainsYuma County
 Cabeza Prieta MountainsYuma County
 Castle Dome MountainsYuma County
 Copper MountainsYuma County
 Gila Mountains (Yuma County)Yuma County
 Kofa MountainsN. Yuma County(S. La Paz County)
 Laguna Mountains (Arizona)Yuma County (see also: Laguna Mountains(Calif))
 Little Horn MountainsS. La Paz County(N. Yuma County)
 Middle MountainsS. La Paz County(N. Yuma County)
 Mohawk MountainsYuma County
 Muggins MountainsYuma County
 New Water MountainsS. La Paz County(connected to Kofa Mountains, N. Yuma County)
 Palomas MountainsYuma County
 Sierra AridaYuma County
 Sierra de la LechuguillaYuma County
 Sierra PintaYuma County
 Tank MountainsYuma County
 Tinajas Altas MountainsYuma County
 Tule MountainsYuma County

See also
 Valley and range sequence-Southern Yuma County
 List of mountain ranges of the Sonoran Desert

Arizona, Yuma County, List of mountain ranges of
|Yuma County, Arizona
Mountain ranges